Catalin Cîmpeanu (born 10 March 1985 in Bacău) is a Romanian athlete specialising in the sprinting events, early in his career concentrating on the 400 metres, before later moving down to 100 metres. He represented his country at many continental level international competitions, his best result being the seventh place at the 2014 European Championships.

He co-holds the national record in the outdoor and indoor 4 × 400 metres relay, as well as in the indoor 60 metres.

Competition record

Personal bests
Outdoor
100 metres – 10.28 (0.0 m/s) (Bucharest 2008)
200 metres – 20.81 (+0.7 m/s) (Bucharest 2008)
400 metres – 46.17 (Barcelona 2010)
Indoor
60 metres – 6.60 (Bucharest 2013) NR
400 metres – 47.05 (Birmingham 2007)

References

1985 births
Living people
Romanian male sprinters
Sportspeople from Bacău
Competitors at the 2009 Summer Universiade